The 1958 FIFA World Cup qualification for North, Central America and the Caribbean serves as the preliminary tournament for the region. Six teams entered the tournament to compete for one place in the final tournament.

Format
There were two rounds of play:
First Round: The 6 teams were divided into 2 groups with 3 teams each (Group 1 with teams from North America and Group 2 with teams from Central America and Caribbean). The teams played against each other on a home-and-away basis. The group winners advanced to the Final Round.
Final Round: The 2 teams played against each other on a home-and-away basis. The winner qualified.

First round

Group 1

Group 2

Final Round

Qualified teams

1 Bold indicates champions for that year. Italic indicates hosts for that year.

Goalscorers

5 goals
 Crescencio Gutiérrez
3 goals
 Salvador Reyes Monteón
 Hector Hernández
 Alfredo Hernández 
 Jorge Hernán Monge
 Álvaro Murillo
 Rodolfo Herrera González
2 goals
 Enrique Sesma
 Carlos González
 Ligorio López
 Brian Philley
 Art Hughes
 Gogie Stewart
 Rubén Jiménez Rodríguez
 Danilo Montero Campos
 Mario Cordero
 Ed Murphy
 López
 Wilfred de Lanoy
1 goal
 Harry Keough
 Ruben Mendoza
 James Murphy
 Norm McLeod
 Ostap Steckiw
 Jorge Vickers
 Augusto Espinoza
 Hubert Sambo
 Edgard Meulens
 Juan Soto Quiros
 Jaime Belmonte

References

External links
FIFA World Cup Official Site - 1958 World Cup Qualification
RSSSF - 1958 World Cup Qualification

1958 FIFA World Cup qualification
FIFA World Cup qualification (CONCACAF)